Eva Fredrika Bonnier (17 November 1857 – 13 January 1909) was a Swedish painter and philanthropist.



Biography 
Born in Stockholm as the daughter of publisher Albert Bonnier and a member of a leading family of publishers, Bonnier studied painting with August Malmström and became a student in the women's section of the Royal Swedish Academy of Arts in Stockholm in 1878. Together with her friend and co-student Hanna Hirsch, she traveled to Paris in 1883, staying there until 1889. Her painting "Music" (1889) was awarded a mention honorable at the Paris Salon. After her return to Sweden in 1889, she was active as a painter until about 1900, mostly of portraits, such as those of Lisen Bonnier (her sister-in-law) as convalescent, industrialist Hjalmar Lundbohm, politician , educator  and poet and scholar Oscar Levertin. Bonnier exhibited her work at the Palace of Fine Arts at the 1893 World's Columbian Exposition in Chicago, Illinois. She is represented with several paintings in the Nationalmuseum, Stockholm. 

After about 1900 Bonnier fell silent as an artist and devoted herself to her philanthropic work, enabled through her inherited wealth. She established a foundation for the beautification of Stockholm, which in its first years financed paintings and sculptures for public places and institutions, such as the Royal Library, Stockholm University, and several Stockholm schools. The foundation remains active.

Bonnier was a member of the women's association Nya Idun.

Bonnier suffered from frequent depressions and took her own life in Copenhagen in 1909, aged 51.

Selected works

References

Gynning, Margareta: Det ambivalenta perspektivet: Eva Bonnier och Hanna Hirsch-Pauli i 1880-talets konstliv, Stockholm, Bonnier, (diss. Uppsala University), 1999.
Hedberg, Tor: "Bonnier, Eva Fredrika", Svenskt biografiskt lexikon, 5, pp. 436–438.

Further reading 
 Gynning, Margareta

External links 

19th-century Swedish painters
1857 births
1909 deaths
Artists from Stockholm
Swedish Jews
Jewish women painters
Jewish painters
Eva
19th-century Swedish women artists
Members of Nya Idun
1909 suicides
Suicides in Denmark